These are the results from the synchronised swimming competition at the 1991 World Aquatics Championships.

Medal table

Medal summary

Multiple medal winners
Mikako Kotani (Japan): won 2 silver medals.

References
https://www.fina.org/sites/default/files/histofina_sy_final_2_0.pdf

 
1991 in synchronized swimming
Synchronised swimming
Synchronised swimming at the World Aquatics Championships
Synchronised swimming in Australia